Mission—Matsqui—Fraser Canyon is a federal electoral district located in Fraser Valley of British Columbia.

Mission—Matsqui—Fraser Canyon was created by the 2012 federal electoral boundaries redistribution and was legally defined in the 2013 representation order. It came into effect upon the call of the 42nd Canadian federal election, which occurred on October 19, 2015. It was created out of the  electoral districts of Pitt Meadows—Maple Ridge—Mission, Abbotsford and Chilliwack—Fraser Canyon.

Demographics

Members of Parliament

This riding has elected the following members of the House of Commons of Canada:

Election results

Notes

References

British Columbia federal electoral districts
Mission, British Columbia
Politics of Abbotsford, British Columbia